Fernando Antonio Cornejo Soto (born October 9, 1998) is a masked Mexican professional wrestler (luchador enmascarado in Spanish) best known under the ring name El Hijo de Canis Lupus. He is primarily known for working for International Wrestling Revolution Group and Pro Wrestling Noah  where he portrays a tecnico ("Good guy") wrestling character. He previously worked under the ring names The Ram and Ram el Carnero. Cornejo is a second-generation wrestler, the son of Fernando Cornejo Camarena who used the name "Golpelador" as a wrestler. His younger brother is also a wrestler, known as Dragón Bane. While he portrays the son of Canis Lupus, they are not related.

As El Hijo de Canis Lupus, Cornejo has won the IWRG Intercontinental Heavyweight Championship, IWRG Junior de Juniors Championship, IWRG Rey del Ring, and is currently one-half of the IWRG Intercontinental Tag Team Championship (with Rey Leon). He teamed up with Trauma I for the 2018 El Protector tournament where they lost in the finals. He previously held the Mexico State Middleweight Championship while working as Ram el Carnero.

Personal life
Fernando Antonio Cornejo Soto was born on October 9, 1998, son of Fernando Cornejo Camarena, a professional wrestler known under the ring name "El Golpeador" ("Striker"). His younger brother is also a professional wrestler, working as the enmascarado (masked wrestler) Dragón Bane. Dragón Bane's given name is not a matter of common knowledge, as he has not been unmasked via a Lucha de Apuestas ("bet match), which is a strictly adhered to tradition in lucha libre.

Championships and accomplishments
International Wrestling Revolution Group

IWRG Intercontinental Heavyweight Championship (1 time)
IWRG Intercontinental Tag Team Championship (1 time, current) – with Rey Leon
IWRG Junior de Juniors Championship (1 time)
IWRG Rey del Ring (1 time)
Mexican independent circuit
Mexico State Middleweight Championship (1 time)
Pro Wrestling Illustrated
Ranked No. 406 of the top 500 singles wrestlers in the PWI 500 in 2021

Luchas de Apuestas record

Footnotes

References

1998 births
Living people
Masked wrestlers
Mexican male professional wrestlers
People from Pachuca
Professional wrestlers from Hidalgo (state)